Mechroha is a district in Souk Ahras Province, Algeria. It was named after its capital, Mechroha.

Municipalities
The district is further divided into 2 municipalities:
Mechroha
Hannencha 

Districts of Souk Ahras Province